Backdoor Bay is a small bay lying at the east side of Cape Royds, along the west side of Ross Island, Antarctica.

History
The British Antarctic Expedition, 1907–09, under Ernest Shackleton, unloaded supplies at Backdoor Bay for use at their winter headquarters on Cape Royds. It was so named by them because it lies at the back (east) side of Cape Royds, opposite the small cove on the west side of the cape, known to them as "Front Door Bay".

Antarctic Specially Protected Area
The area is protected as Antarctic Specially Protected Area (ASPA) No.157 because of its historical associations and artefacts.  It contains Shackleton's Hut, built in February 1908, as well as stables, kennels, a latrine, a garage for what was the first motor vehicle in Antarctica, an instrument shelter, supply depots and a rubbish site.

References

 

Bays of Ross Island
Antarctic Specially Protected Areas
Heroic Age of Antarctic Exploration